Nettl is a surname. Notable people with the surname include:

  (1889–1972) Czech-American musicologist
 Bruno Nettl (1930–2020), Czech-American ethnomusicologist and musicologist
 J. P. Nettl (1926–1968), British historian

See also
 Ettl
 Nettle (disambiguation)